Federico Conforti (Padova, 10 March 1992) is a retired Italian rugby union player.
His usual position was as a Flanker. 

For 2016–17 Pro12 season, he named like Additional Player for Benetton. 

After playing for Italy Under 20 in 2011 and 2012, in 2016 and 2018, Conforti was also named in the Emerging Italy squad for annual World Rugby Nations Cup.

References

External links 
It's Rugby English Profile
ESPN Profile
F.I.R. Academy Profiles

Sportspeople from Padua
Italian rugby union players
1992 births
Living people
Rugby union flankers
Petrarca Rugby players
Valorugby Emilia players